The Barronvale Bridge, also known as Barron's Mill Bridge, is a historic covered bridge at Middlecreek Township, in Somerset County, Pennsylvania crossing Laurel Hill Creek. At  it is the longest remaining covered bridge in Somerset County. The Burr truss bridge was built in 1902, and is one of 10 covered bridges in Somerset County.

References

Covered bridges on the National Register of Historic Places in Pennsylvania
Bridges completed in 1902
Bridges in Somerset County, Pennsylvania
Covered bridges in Somerset County, Pennsylvania
National Register of Historic Places in Somerset County, Pennsylvania
Road bridges on the National Register of Historic Places in Pennsylvania
Wooden bridges in Pennsylvania
Burr Truss bridges in the United States